Barree Forge and Furnace, now known as Greene Hills Methodist Camp, is a national historic district located at Porter Township in Huntingdon County, Pennsylvania. It consists of two contributing buildings, one contributing site, and one contributing structure associated with a former ironworks.  They are the ironmaster's mansion, furnace stack, a barn, and the site of the Barree iron forge built about 1797.  The ironmaster's mansion was built in the 1830s, and is a 2 1/2-story brick house painted white. The furnace stack dates to 1864, and is a 30-foot square, coursed limestone structure. It measures between 6 and 15 feet tall.  The ironworks closed in the 1880s.  The property was acquired in 1963, by the United Methodist Church for use as a church camp.

It was listed on the National Register of Historic Places in 1990.

References

External links
Greene Hills Methodist Camp website

Industrial buildings and structures on the National Register of Historic Places in Pennsylvania
Industrial buildings completed in 1864
Buildings and structures in Huntingdon County, Pennsylvania
Historic districts on the National Register of Historic Places in Pennsylvania
National Register of Historic Places in Huntingdon County, Pennsylvania
1864 establishments in Pennsylvania